The 2012 All-Australian team represents the best performed Australian Football League (AFL) players during the 2012 season. It was announced on 17 September as a complete Australian rules football team of 22 players. The team is honorary and does not play any games.

Selection panel
The selection panel for the 2012 All-Australian team consisted of chairman Andrew Demetriou, Adrian Anderson, Kevin Bartlett, Luke Darcy, Danny Frawley, Gerard Healy, Glen Jakovich and Mark Ricciuto.

Team

Initial squad
At the conclusion of the 2012 AFL home and away season, a provisional squad of 40 players was chosen and later announced on 5 September.

Final team

Note: the position of coach in the All-Australian team is traditionally awarded to the coach of the premiership team.

References

All-Australian team
All-Australian Team